In mathematical notation, ordered set operators indicate whether an object precedes or succeeds another. These relationship operators are denoted by the unicode symbols U+227A-F, along with symbols located unicode blocks U+228x through U+22Ex.

Examples

 The relationship x precedes y is written x ≺ y. The relation x precedes or is equal to y is written x ≼ y.
 The relationship x succeeds (or follows) y is written x ≻ y. The relation x succeeds or is equal to y is written x ≽ y.

Use in political science 
Political scientists use order relations typically in the context of an agent's choice, for example the preferences of a voter over several political candidates.

 x ≺ y means that the voter prefers candidate y over candidate x.
 x ∼ y means the voter is indifferent between candidates x and y.
 x ≲ y means the voter is indifferent or prefers candidate y.

References

See also

 Order theory
 Partially ordered set
 Directional symbols
 Polynomial-time reduction
 Wolfram Mathworld: precedes and succeeds

Mathematical symbols